The Private Case of the British Library is a collection of erotic printed books, transferred from the British Museum in 1973.  The collection is similar in purpose to the Enfer at the Bibliothèque nationale, the Δ (Greek Delta) collection in the Library of Congress and the Φ collection (Greek Phi) at the Bodleian Library.

The Private Case, established in the 1850s, contains material from the main British Museum library collection that was segregated on grounds of perceived obscenity, under the Victorian mores of the time. Its name derives from it being kept originally in lockable book cases within the Keeper's Room. Individual items were moved in and out of the Private Case as attitudes towards obscenity shifted over time. The collection has approximately 250 volumes today, but has held up to 4000 volumes in the past. It consists predominantly of printed fiction and poetry, with some social science material, that range in date from the 17th to the late 20th century. There is also some typescript, microfilm and photographic material. The collection contains works by notable figures in the world of written erotica including The Earl of Rochester, the Marquis de Sade and William Simpson Potter.

Amidst individual items that were transferred from the general collection or acquired by donation, purchase or legal deposit are a number of sub-collections given as bequests. The most significant gift was that of Henry Spencer Ashbee, who gave approximately 700 volumes in 1900, although 200 of these were later transferred elsewhere. David Lindsay, 27th Earl of Crawford, bequeathed over 100 volumes. The 'Eliot-Phelips' collection, formed by Edward Phelips (1882–1928), was added to the Private Case in 1950. Charles Reginald Dawes  bequeathed approximately 250 volumes in 1964. Smaller donations were also made by Beecher Moore, Alfred Rose (1876–1936) and Dr Eric Dingwall, also an honorary curator of the Private Case.

The Private Case has been a static, closed collection since 1990, and every item has an individual record on the British Library Explore Catalogue. Only two items are restricted due to their fragile condition; everything else is available for registered readers to consult in the Rare Books & Manuscripts Reading Room without the need for curatorial permission.

See also
Secretum (British Museum)

References

 Craig, Alec, "Above all Liberties", London: Allen and Unwin, 1942
 Fryer, Peter, "Private Case – Public Scandal", London: Secker and Warburg, 1966
 Douzinas, Costas, Nead, Lynda, eds., Law and the image: the authority of art and the aesthetics of law, University of Chicago Press, 1999, p. 212
 Frayser, Suzanne G, Whitby, Thomas J, "Studies in Human Sexuality: a selected guide", Libraries Unlimited, 1995, p. 681
 A Supplement by Patrick Kearney and Neil Crawford was published in 2017 by Ian Jackson Books of Berkeley.

British pornography
British Library collections
1857 establishments in England
Research libraries in the United Kingdom